Henry Massie Rector (May 1, 1816August 12, 1899) was an American politician and lawyer who served as the sixth governor of Arkansas from 1860 to 1862.

Early life and education 
Henry Massie Rector was born in Louisville, Kentucky, the son of Fannie Bardella (Thruston) and Elias Rector. His Rector family descended from the German-speaking families of Germanna in the Colony of Virginia, though both parents were also of English descent. He was educated by his mother and attended two years of school in Louisville. He moved to Arkansas in 1835, where he was later appointed U.S. Marshal.

Political career 
Rector was elected to the Arkansas Senate and served in that body from 1848 to 1850. He studied law and was admitted to the bar in 1854. From 1853 to 1857, he served as U.S. Surveyor-General of Arkansas for several years. From 1855 to 1859, he served in the Arkansas House of Representatives and spent one term as a justice of the Arkansas Supreme Court.

Rector was elected Governor of Arkansas in 1860. During his term Arkansas seceded from the U.S. and was admitted into the Confederate States. The constitution of Arkansas was rewritten reducing the term of office for Governor to two years. At the Arkansas secession convention in March 1861, Rector addressed the convention in an oratory urging the extension of slavery:

Rector left office in 1862 and served as a private in the state militia for the rest of the war. He participated in the 1874 constitutional convention.

Personal life 
Rector was the first cousin of Representative Henry Conway, Governor James Conway and Governor Elias Conway. Rector was also a third cousin of General James Kemper. He was a first cousin of fellow Confederate general Alexander Steen.

His son, Elias, ran for Governor of Arkansas twice and served in the Arkansas House of Representatives for several terms, served as Speaker of the House, and married the daughter of Senator James Alcorn of Mississippi. His grandson, James, was the first Arkansan to participate in the Olympic Games.

Death 
Rector died in Little Rock and is buried in Mount Holly Cemetery there.

Memorials 
Rector Street in Little Rock is named after him. The north-bound frontage road along Interstate 30 bears his name. The northeast Arkansas town of Rector is also named after him.

See also  
 List of governors of Arkansas
 The Family (Arkansas politics)

References

External links 
 
 Henry Massey Rector at The Political Graveyard
 

1816 births
1899 deaths
19th-century American lawyers
19th-century American politicians
1852 United States presidential electors
Methodists from Arkansas
American people of English descent
American proslavery activists
American surveyors
Arkansas lawyers
Democratic Party Arkansas state senators
Justices of the Arkansas Supreme Court
Burials at Mount Holly Cemetery
Confederate States of America state governors
Conway-Johnson family
Deaths in Arkansas
Democratic Party governors of Arkansas
Farmers from Arkansas
Democratic Party members of the Arkansas House of Representatives
People from Louisville, Kentucky
People of Arkansas in the American Civil War
Politicians from Hot Spring County, Arkansas
Politicians from Little Rock, Arkansas
Politicians from Saline County, Arkansas
Recipients of American presidential pardons
U.S. state supreme court judges admitted to the practice of law by reading law
United States Marshals